Rheinfelden railway station could refer to:

 Rheinfelden railway station (Switzerland), a railway station in Rheinfelden, Aargau, Switzerland
 Rheinfelden (Baden) station, a railway station in Rheinfelden, Baden-Württemberg, Germany